Thomson High School is a public high school located in Thomson, Georgia, United States. It is the only high school in the McDuffie County School District.

Demographics
White, 44.93%
Black, 51.68%
Hispanic, 2.02%
Asian, 0.28%
Multi-racial, 0.96%

Notable alumni
 John Atkins professional football player currently on Detroit Lions practice squad
 Jasper Brinkley, a free agent in the NFL
 Vonteego Cummings, former NBA player, currently plays in Greece
 Darius Eubanks, a free agent in the nfl
 Ray Guy, retired NFL Hall of Fame punter for the Oakland Raiders
 James Harris, former professional football player
 Eddie Lee Ivery, retired NFL player for the Green Bay Packers
 Franklin Langham, professional golfer
 Jerry Mays, retired NFL running back for the San Diego Chargers

References

External links
Thomson High School

Public high schools in Georgia (U.S. state)
Schools in McDuffie County, Georgia